USS Harry S. Truman (CVN-75) is the eighth  of the United States Navy, named after the 33rd President of the United States, Harry S. Truman. She is currently homeported at Naval Station Norfolk, Virginia.

Harry S. Truman was launched on 7 September 1996 by Newport News Shipbuilding, Newport News, Virginia, and commissioned on 25 July 1998 with Captain Thomas Otterbein in command. President Bill Clinton was the keynote speaker, and other notable attendees and speakers included Missouri Representative Ike Skelton, Missouri Governor Mel Carnahan, Secretary of Defense William Cohen and Secretary of the Navy John H. Dalton.

Harry S. Truman was initially the flagship of Carrier Group Two and, beginning 1 October 2004, of Carrier Strike Group Ten.

Beginning in 2001, the Harry S. Truman Carrier Battle Group participated in Operation Joint Endeavor, Operation Deny Flight, Operation Southern Watch, Operation Enduring Freedom – Afghanistan, Operation Iraqi Freedom, Summer Pulse '04, and NATO Operation Medshark/Majestic Eagle '04.

In the first half of 2016, Harry S. Truman, as flagship of Carrier Strike Group 8, carried out an 8-month air operation deployment against ISIL from the Eastern Mediterranean as part of Operation Inherent Resolve. The ship has been the flagship of Carrier Strike Group 8 since June 2014.

Description
The supercarrier can accommodate around 90 aircraft and has a flight deck  in size, using four elevators that are  each to move planes between the flight deck and the hangar bay. With a combat load, HST displaces almost 97,000 tons and can accommodate 6,250 crewmembers.

She is currently equipped with three 20 mm Phalanx CIWS mounts and two Sea Sparrow SAM launchers.

Harry S. Truman cost over $4.5 billion in 2007 dollars to construct.

Propulsion
Two Westinghouse A4W nuclear reactors are used for propulsion, which means that the ship is capable of steaming more than three million miles before refueling.

Awards
Harry S. Truman has been the recipient of numerous awards recognizing the ship's excellence. They include
Battenberg Cup 2003
Battle "E" in 2003, 2004, 2005, 2008, 2009, 2010, and 2014
Dorie P. Miller Memorial Award for Food Service in 2002 and 2004
Marjorie Sterrett Battleship Fund Award, an honor given to the most battle-ready ship in the U.S. Atlantic Fleet 2004 and 2009
Ney Award in 1999, 2000, 2001 and 2005
Admiral Stan Arthur Award, 2004

Ship's seal and battle flag

The oval seal was designed by the ship's pre-commissioning crew and is primarily blue and gold. According to the ship's history webpage, the coat of arms "characterizes the global on-station capability of the ship and the United States Navy" and "Truman's name forms the shape of a forward-deployed aircraft carrier prepared to uphold and protect American interests". The three flags near the bottom represent the letters "HST". The 33 gold stars surrounding the seal represent Truman's position as the 33rd President.

The Harry S. Truman battle flag was also designed by the ship's crew, and is a variation of the guidons carried by the companies of the 129th Field Artillery Regiment of the 35th Infantry Division, such as Battery D, the battery under the command of then-Army Capt. Harry Truman during World War I. It consists of crossed cannons on a scarlet background with the phrase "Give 'em hell", a reference to Truman's 1948 re-election campaign.

Ship history

Pre-commissioning and construction

Her keel was laid by Newport News Shipbuilding on 29 November 1993 and the ship was christened on 7 September 1996.

Three Newport News ship workers died during construction when a pump room filled with methane and hydrogen sulfide gases during a sewage leak on 12 July 1997. They are commemorated by a brass plaque in the tunnel off Hangar Bay No. 1. The ship was christened on 7 September 1996, launched 13 September 1996, and the crew began moving aboard from contract housing in Newport News in January 1998. The ship successfully completed builder's sea trial on 11 June 1998 after a short delay due to noise issues in one of the reactor closure heads. The ship was officially accepted by the Navy on 30 June 1998 and was commissioned on 25 July 1998 at Naval Station Norfolk.

Commissioning
The keynote speaker of the commissioning ceremony was President Bill Clinton. Other notable attendees and speakers were: Rep. Ike Skelton, D-Mo., who pushed to have the carrier named after the 33rd president; Missouri Governor Mel Carnahan; Captain Thomas Otterbein, Harry S. Trumans first commanding officer; Secretary of Defense William Cohen; and Secretary of the Navy John H. Dalton.

1998–1999
In August 1998, Harry S. Truman left port for the first time to conduct certifications to test her ability to recover and launch aircraft successfully. That was followed by numerous sea trials that challenged the ship and her crew with various training exercises.

2000-2001
On 28 November 2000, Harry S. Truman began her maiden deployment with Carrier Air Wing 3 (CVW-3) on board.

On 26 December 2000, Harry S. Truman transited the Suez Canal "in support of Operation Southern Watch" with Carrier Air Wing Three flying 869 combat sorties, including a strike on Iraqi integrated air defense system sites, in a sanctioned response to Iraqi surface-to-air missile fire against United Nations Security Council coalition forces. Combat operations ended on 27 April. Almost six months later and after  of traveling, she returned to the U.S. on 23 May. She then entered Norfolk Naval Shipyard in Portsmouth, Virginia, for her first planned incremental availability (PIA) on 5 September 2001.

2002–2003

On 5 December 2002, HST left for her second deployment, again with CVW-3 embarked, visiting Marseille, France, Souda Bay, Crete and Koper, Slovenia. Between 19 March and 18 April, airwing aircraft flew nearly 1,300 combat sorties from the Mediterranean Sea in the early stages of 2003 invasion of Iraq. The ship stopped in Portsmouth, England, 
before returning to Norfolk on 23 May.

In August 2003, Harry S. Truman began her second PIA at Norfolk Naval Shipyard (NNSY).

2004–2005

On 13 February 2004, Harry S. Truman left under budget and four days early from Norfolk Naval Shipyard.

On 2 June 2004, Harry S. Truman "surged" for Exercise Summer Pulse, deploying to the Mediterranean Sea. The ship called at Naples, Italy, and participated in Operation Majestic Eagle in the eastern Atlantic Ocean before returning to NNSY on 25 July.

On 1 October 2004, as part of a Navy-wide series of redesignations, Harry S. Trumans immediate superior in command  changed to Carrier Strike Group Ten. The ship set out from Norfolk on her third extended deployment on 13 October 2004, and visited Souda Bay, Crete, before relieving  on 20 November in the Persian Gulf.
Harry S. Truman and CVW-3 launched 2,577 sorties, totaling nearly 13,000 flight hours, flying combat missions over Iraq and maritime security operations before being relieved by  Carrier Strike Group in the Persian Gulf on 19 March 2005. Despite plans to cross the equator and visit South Africa, diplomatic issues caused her, instead, to transit the Suez Canal, stopping in Portsmouth, England, prior to returning home on 18 April 2005.

On 1 September 2005, in response to the disaster of Hurricane Katrina, Harry S. Truman set sail for the devastated U.S. Gulf Coast. She arrived in the Gulf of Mexico on 4 September and served as the flagship for the naval task force. While the ship's strike group (Carrier Strike Group 10) commander, Rear Adm. Joseph Kilkenny, was appointed deputy commander of Joint Task Force Gulf Coast (also known as JTF Katrina and Rita), the ship remained anchored in the gulf and provided desalinated water for the relief effort via helicopter (the actual command hub for the JTF was ). The carrier also provided support to JRB New Orleans in the form of aviation boatswain's mates and cooks to keep that station in operation. Harry S. Truman returned to home port in October 2005 after five weeks of relief efforts.

2006
In January, Harry S. Truman entered the NNSY for a docked PIA. The ship received many system upgrades, and underwent preventive maintenance to repair minor weld defects originating from the initial construction of the reactor plants. She left the yard in December and continued preparations for surge beginning in April 2007.

2007
On 15 August, an E-2C Hawkeye crashed after taking off from the carrier, killing all three crewmembers.

On 5 November, Harry S. Truman left Norfolk for her fourth extended deployment with CVW-3 embarked in support of OIF.

2008
HST returned to the U.S. in June. She first pulled into Naval Station Mayport, Florida, to welcome aboard family and friends for a three-day "Tiger Cruise" or Family Day Cruise, before returning to Norfolk Naval Station on 4 June 2008. The ship was awarded her fourth Battle E award for the East Coast (for 2008) in early 2009. Jimmy Buffett visited the ship and performed a concert on 28 January.

2009
In February, HST completed a nearly seven-month PIA at the NNSY in Portsmouth, VA.

On 5 August, EA-18G Growlers from Electronic Attack Squadron 129 (VAQ-129) and Electronic Attack Squadron 132 (VAQ-132) completed their first at-sea carrier-arrested landing (trap) aboard Harry S. Truman.

2010
Harry S. Truman began a seven-month deployment to the 5th and 6th Fleet areas of operations in support of maritime security operations.

On 21 May, Harry S. Truman led a task force of 11 American warships and 5,000 men into the Suez Canal.

On 20 June, the ship visited four ports during her 213 days at sea, including Marseille, France; Dubai, U.A.E; Manama, Bahrain; and Souda Bay, Crete, before returning to the United States on 21 December. During the deployment, Harry S. Truman traveled more than 50,000 nautical miles and flew more than 10,000 sorties in support of Operations Enduring Freedom and New Dawn.

2011

On 2 February, Commander, Naval Air Force U.S. Atlantic Fleet named Harry S. Truman as the Battle "E", award winner, which was her third consecutive Battle "E" award. This was the sixth award in the ship's 12-year history, having previously won the Battle "E" award in 2003, 2004, 2005, 2008, and 2009.

Harry S. Truman entered a docked PIA at NNSY in late March.

On 28 February, the aircraft carrier began her dry-docking PIA maintenance and yard overhaul period at NNSY in Portsmouth (pictured). During this maintenance cycle, Harry S. Truman received a new main mast, an upgrade in her close-in weapons systems, and the installation of the automated digital network system, which provides the carrier with enhanced communications and cooperative engagement capabilities to assess possible threats. Harry S. Truman was expected to complete this DPIA yard overhaul in early 2012 and begin preparations for her sixth overseas deployment. Also, her berthing spaces were also upgraded, installing 2,500 racks, replacing 46,000 square feet of deck and painting 106,000 square feet of spaces.

On 8 November, Captain Tushar Tembe died after collapsing on a pier near the ship. The ship's executive officer (XO) assumed the role of acting command officer, until relieved by Captain Dee L. Mewbourne three days later, and resuming his post as XO.

2012

On 7 April, Norfolk Naval Shipyard completed the ship's nuclear power plant modernization and testing was to begin to ensure her readiness for sea trials lasting 90 days. Harry S. Truman returned to the U.S. Navy fleet in the summer of 2012.

On 26 November, an X-47B unmanned combat air system  was hoisted on board Harry S. Truman in preparation for an unmanned aircraft's first, carrier-based testing. Harry S. Truman was to be the first aircraft carrier in naval aviation history to host test operations for an unmanned aircraft. Testing on the X-47B was conducted over a three-week period that included in-port and underway demonstrations aboard. The X-47B successfully completed carrier deck tests aboard Harry S. Truman on 18 December 2012.

2013
On 6 February, the U.S. Department of Defense announced that the upcoming deployment of Harry S. Truman, the  guided-missile cruiser , and the rest of Carrier Strike Group 10 will be postponed pending the resolution of the upcoming budget sequestration, leaving the carrier  and her carrier strike group as the only carrier force operating in the Persian Gulf region. The strike group was originally scheduled to depart Naval Station Norfolk, Virginia, on 8 February 2013.

On 22 July, Harry S. Truman left for an extended deployment to the 5th Fleet area of responsibility, and settled into her mission of supporting Operation Enduring Freedom and the coalition of troops on the ground in Afghanistan.

2014
On 14 February, the Commander, Naval Air Force U.S. Atlantic Fleet named Harry S. Truman as the East Coast aircraft carrierBattle "E" award winner.

2015
On 16 November, Harry S. Truman, assigned with Carrier Air Wing Seven, began a scheduled deployment to the U.S. 6th and 5th Fleet areas of operation.

On 21 December, Djibouti President Ismail Omar Guelleh visited USS Harry S. Truman stationed near the Yemeni island of Berim. Iran had announced over maritime radio it was carrying out tests "only 23 minutes before" and was criticized by the U.S. Central Command for "Firing weapons so close to passing coalition ships and commercial traffic within an internationally recognized maritime traffic lane."

On 29 December, Harry S. Truman began launching strikes against the Islamic State group.

2016
On 12 January, an unarmed Iranian drone flew directly over Harry S. Truman in international waters and took "precise" photos, according to state television in the Islamic Republic.

In the first half of 2016, Harry S. Truman, as flagship of Carrier Strike Group 8, carried out an eight-month air operation deployment against ISIL from the Eastern Mediterranean as part of Operation Inherent Resolve. On 3 June, F/A-18 Hornets launched from Harry S. Truman conducted air strikes against ISIS targets from the eastern Mediterranean. It was the first time the U.S. Navy had conducted strike missions in the Middle East from the Mediterranean Sea since flying operations against the Iraqi military in 2003.

CVW-1 was reassigned to Harry S. Truman. On 25 August, she entered NNSY for her "10-month" PIA that is "expected to be completed" a year after work officially begins on 27 September.

2017
On 21 July, the refit was concluded and was followed by various training exercises placing emphasis on damage control, flight deck operations, and simulated combat at-sea.

2018

Carrier Strike Group 8 began a further scheduled deployment to the Middle East and Europe on 11 April 2018. The carrier returned to Norfolk on 21 July and left again for operations in the Western Atlantic Ocean on 28 August.

On 25 October, the carrier took part in the NATO exercise Trident Juncture, which was held in and around Norway.

2019
On 27 February, the Pentagon announced that Harry S. Trumans midlife refueling and overhaul, tentatively scheduled for 2024, may be cancelled and the ship instead retired early as a cost-saving measure. The likelihood of the ship actually being decommissioned more than 20 years ahead of schedule was uncertain, as this would have left the carrier fleet at 10 ships, one below the legally mandated level. The nominated chief of naval operations told Congress he supports "to forgo" the $ 3.5 billion overhaul scheduled for the HST. Congress prevented the Navy from taking the same action with sister ship  in 2016, as well as the White House, as President Donald Trump had promised to increase the carrier fleet to 12.

On 1 May, President Trump announced he overrode the decision to decommission USS Harry S. Truman.

In late August, a malfunction of the ship's electrical distribution system was announced as the cause that would prevent her scheduled deployment.

In late October the ship's electrical malfunction was repaired and Harry S. Truman departed Norfolk to be deployed in the Persian Gulf. She was reported as entering the 6th Fleet region on 2 December 2019.

2020 
In July 2020, USS Harry S. Truman was at NNSY in Portsmouth.

2021 
Harry S. Truman, along with CVW-1 and her battlegroup, deployed out to sea on 1 December 2021. She was originally planned to transit the Suez Canal into the Middle East, but in light of the standoff between Russia and Ukraine in late 2021 escalating, the carrier was ordered to stay in the Mediterranean.

2022 

In January 2022, Harry S. Truman and her strike group came under command of NATO's Naval Striking and Support Forces for the first time since the Cold War, for a 10-day exercise patrolling the Mediterranean.

From 17 May to 23 May, Harry S. Truman and Carrier Strike Group 8 took part in the NATO vigilance activity, Neptune Shield 2022.

On 8 July 2022, an F/A-18E Super Hornet of Carrier Air Wing One was blown overboard into the Mediterranean Sea. The carrier had encountered unexpected heavy weather while conducting a replenishment-at-sea. One sailor received minor injuries. On 8 August 2022, the United States Sixth Fleet announced the lost aircraft had been recovered from a depth of  using a remotely operated CURV-21 recovery vehicle. On 8 August 2022, The Aviationist reported that based on a photo sent to the outlet, taken at the Port of Augusta, Sicily, they were able to identify the involved aircraft as the aircraft with modex 205, part of Strike Fighter Squadron 211 (VFA-211). The aircraft was loaded aboard Military Sealift Command roll-on/roll-off ship  at the Port of Augusta on 16 August 2022 to be transported back to the United States.

Harry S. Truman returned to Naval Station Norfolk on 12 September 2022. On 21 November 2022, the Navy accepted Auxiliary Personnel Lighter 68 (APL68), with around 600 berths (mixed gender), saying it would support the impending Harry S. Truman carrier repair cycle.

See also
List of aircraft carriers of the United States Navy
List of United States Navy aircraft designations (pre-1962) (historical)
List of United States naval aircraft (current)
List of United States Navy aircraft squadrons
Modern United States Navy carrier air operations
Naval aviation
United States Naval Aviator

References

External links

Official USS Harry S. Truman website
Official USS Harry S. Truman Facebook Page
Official USS Harry S. Truman Twitter Page #CVN75
Official USS Harry S. Truman Wordpress Page
Official USS Harry S. Truman DVIDS Hub Page
An unofficial USS Harry S. Truman webpage
Harry S.Harry S. Truman Continues Preparations to Aid Hurricane Relief
Maritimequest USS Harry S. Truman CVN-75 Photo Gallery
The Examiner – Harry S. Truman Commissioning Special Edition
USS Harry S. Truman history at U.S. Carriers
USS Harry S. Truman (CVN-75) Story Archive - U.S. Navy

 

Nimitz-class aircraft carriers
1996 ships
Nuclear ships of the United States Navy
Aircraft carriers of the United States
Ships built in Newport News, Virginia